Bertha of Hereford, also known as Bertha de Pitres (born c. 1130), was the daughter of Miles de Gloucester, 1st Earl of Hereford, and a wealthy heiress, Sibyl de Neufmarché. She was the wife of William de Braose, 3rd Lord of Bramber to whom she brought many castles and Lordships, such as Brecknock (including Hay Castle), and Abergavenny.

Family
Bertha was born in England in about 1130. She was a daughter of Miles, Earl of Hereford (1097- 24 December 1143) and Sibyl de Neufmarché. She had two sisters, Margaret of Hereford, who married Humphrey II de Bohun, by whom she had issue, and Lucy of Hereford, who married Herbert FitzHerbert of Winchester, by whom she had issue. Her brothers included Roger Fitzmiles, 2nd Earl of Hereford, Walter de Hereford, Henry Fitzmiles, William de Hereford, and Mahel de Hereford.

Bertha's paternal grandparents were Walter FitzRoger de Pitres, Sheriff of Gloucester and Bertha de Balun of Bateden, a descendant of Hamelin de Balun, and her maternal grandparents were Bernard de Neufmarché, Lord of Brecon, and Nesta ferch Osbern. The latter was a daughter of Osbern FitzRichard of Richard's Castle, and Nesta ferch Gruffydd. Bertha was a direct descendant, in the maternal line, of Gruffydd ap Llywelyn (1007- 5 August 1063) and Edith (Aldgyth), daughter of Elfgar, Earl of Mercia.

Bertha's father Miles served as Constable to King Stephen of England. He later served in the same capacity to Empress Matilda after he'd transferred his allegiance. In 1141, she made him Earl of Hereford in gratitude for his loyalty. On 24 December 1143, he was killed whilst on a hunting expedition in the Forest of Dean.

Marriage and issue 

In 1150, Bertha married William de Braose, 3rd Lord of Bramber (1112–1192), son of Philip de Braose, 2nd Lord of Bramber and Aenor, daughter of Judael of Totnes. William and Bertha had three daughters and two sons, including William de Braose, 4th Lord of Bramber.

In 1173, Bertha's brothers all having died without issue, she brought the Lordships and castles of Brecknock and Abergavenny, to her husband. Hay Castle had already passed to her from her mother, Sibyl of Neufmarche in 1165, whence it became part of the de Braose holdings.

In 1174, Bertha's husband became Sheriff of Hereford.

Bertha's children include
 William de Braose, 4th Lord of Bramber, (1144/1153- 11 August 1211, Corbeil), married Maud de St. Valery, daughter of Bernard de St. Valery, by whom he had 16 children.
 Roger de Braose or Reynold de Briouse
 Sibyl de Braose (died after 5 February 1227), married William de Ferrers, 3rd Earl of Derby (1136- 21 October 1190 at Acre on crusade), son of Robert de Ferrers, 2nd Earl of Derby and Margaret Peverel, by whom she had issue.
 Maud de Braose, married John de Brompton, by whom she had issue.

Legacy
Bertha died on an unknown date. She was the ancestress of many noble English families which included the de Braoses, de Beauchamps, de Bohuns and de Ferrers; as well as the Irish families of de Lacy and de Burgh.

Ancestry

References

Sources

Anglo-Normans
Anglo-Norman women
1130s births
Year of death unknown
Daughters of British earls
12th-century English women
12th-century English people